This is a list of people elected Fellow of the Royal Society in 1952.

Fellows 

Sir Wallace Alan Akers
Cecil Edwin Henry Bawn
Norman John Berrill
Edward Ettingdean Bridges, Baron Bridges
John Hubert Craigie
Freeman John Dyson
Dame Honor Bridget Fell
Dalziel Llewellyn Hammick
Leonard Hawkes
William Owen James
Harry Jones
Sir Bernard Katz
Max Rudolf Lemberg
Sir William Hunter McCrea
Joseph Stanley Mitchell
Albert Cyril Offord
Sir Alfred Grenville Pugsley
Robert Russell Race
Sir Martin Ryle
David Macleish Smith
Frank Stuart Spring
Edward Wilfred Taylor
Samuel Tolansky
Marthe Louise Vogt
Thomas Stanley Westoll
Donald Devereux Woods

Foreign members

Sven Otto Horstadius
Albert Jan Kluyver
Albert Marcel Germain Rene Portevin
Tadeus Reichstein

1952
1952 in science
1952 in the United Kingdom